Todd Martin Bodine (born February 27, 1964) is an American professional stock car racing driver. He last competed part-time in the NASCAR Camping World Truck Series, driving the No. 62 Toyota Tundra for Halmar Friesen Racing, and current racing analyst for Fox NASCAR. Todd is the younger brother of former racers Geoffrey and Brett Bodine. Bodine is known for his bald head, which has given him the nickname The Onion.

Early career
Bodine would make his Busch Series debut in 1986, for Pistone Racing at Martinsville. He qualified and finished 27th in the 30-car field, falling out of the race early with an engine problem.

1990s
Bodine went on a three-year hiatus from the series until 1990, when he would drive eight races for the Highline Racing #42/#81 Ames-sponsored Pontiac, making his season debut at Martinsville. He started 11th and finished in the eighth position. He then followed that up with finishes of seventh at Orange County and third at Dover Downs.

In 1991, he signed to drive for Frank Cicci. In his first full season in the series, he won his first career race, one of 15 Top 10s in 1991. Bodine also won his first two poles: Back to back at Dublin and South Boston. He ended the year seventh in points.

Bodine's career in Cup started at Watkins Glen International Raceway on August 9, 1992 when he was 28 years old. He raced the No. 34 Diet Pepsi Ford Thunderbird for Cicci-Welliver Racing, finishing 37th. It was revealed in 2022 in The Scene Vault Podcast, that though the listed owner was Cicci-Welliver, the car was in fact owned by, and the team of, Junie Donlavey of Donlavey Racing. They re-numbered Junie's car as a team "rental" to further the attention of Bodine's Busch Series team. Bodine revealed in the podcast that the technicality of the listed car owner was disappointing after Donlavey's death in 2014, Todd was not listed as one of "Junie's Army", or Junie's many Cup Series drivers, as the two were friends. His first full-time season came in 1994 when he raced for Butch Mock Motorsports.  He raced the No. 75 Ford Thunderbird sponsored by Factory Stores. He missed one race the whole season and scored two Top 5s and seven Top 10s on his way to a 20th-place position in the points standings. He was unable to match those statistics in 1995 as he finished 33rd in the points with only one Top 5 and three Top 10s. Following his release from Butch Mock, Bodine spent 1996, filling in for Bill Elliott in a four-race span, finishing 10th at Pocono. He also drove three races apiece for David Blair Motorsports and Andy Petree Racing. In 1997, he filled in for Ricky Craven at Hendrick Motorsports at Texas and for his brother, Geoff at Charlotte Motor Speedway, before he won the pole at Watkins Glen for Cicci-Welliver in a one-race deal. He finished 35th due to engine problems in that race. Todd started races for five different teams in 1997. At Loudon, he relieved Jeff Burton, who had an inner ear problem, and exited his Roush Racing car after 68 laps.

For 1998, he signed with a new team called ISM Racing. The team struggled and he was temporarily replaced by Loy Allen, Jr. for the Pepsi 400 in July, then after the race was delayed to October was fired by the team before the next race at New Hampshire International Speedway. He went back to Cicci-Welliver in the Busch Series, replacing rookie Mike Cope in the No. 30 Slim Jim-sponsored car. He finished 33rd in points despite running 13 races and posted a string of five consecutive Top 5 finishes. He also ran part-time in cup for LJ Racing, posting a fifth at Atlanta.

In 1999, his Cicci-Welliver team switched to No. 66, and he posted ten Top 5's en route to a fourth-place points finish. In addition, he ran seven races for Eel River Racing at the Cup level, his best finish being 15th at Bristol. In 2000, he won a pole at Talladega as well as the race at Michigan.

2000–2004

He would get back into Cup racing full-time in 2001 while racing the No. 66 K-Mart-sponsored Ford Taurus which was owned by Haas-Carter Motorsports. Despite getting three poles, he only scored two Top 5s, missed the Daytona 500, and was plagued with 12 DNFs, causing him to finish 29th in points. He also won the exhibition No-Bull Sprint, which put him into the Winston at Lowe's Motor Speedway. He also ran half the schedule in the Busch Series, winning two of the first three races of the season with Buckshot Racing, before ending the season driving for Fitz Motorsports. He started 2002 with the 66, but lost his ride after Kmart filed for bankruptcy. He signed on to Herzog Motorsports and won the Kroger 300, finishing 23rd in points. During the season, he rejoined Haas-Carter when Discover Card became the team's primary sponsor. He garnered a fifth-place run at Richmond, and finished 38th in points.
In 2003, Carter partnered with Sam Belnavis to field the No. 54 United States National Guard-sponsored Ford for Bodine. Bodine's best finish that year was an eighth at Pocono and he finished 31st in standings. After that year, Belnavis abandoned the operation and took sponsors National Guard and Subway to Roush Racing and the Carter team closed its doors due to the lack of sponsorship.  Bodine also got a win at Darlington in the Busch Series for Herzog and led the Busch Series points standings but again a lack of sponsorship forced his team to close. He ended the season at Innovative Motorsports. He split 2004 between Mach 1 Racing, Arnold Motorsports, and R&J Racing, his best finish a 23rd at Bristol. He ran five Busch races for GIC-Mixon Motorsports and Marsh Racing, finishing fifth at Homestead.

Camping World Truck Series
Bodine made his Craftsman Truck Series debut in 1995 driving for Roush Racing's No. 61 Ford for 5 races. In his debut, Bodine qualified 3rd on the road course at Heartland Park Topeka, and finished fourth. His worst finish was at Mesa Marin Raceway, where he finished eighth an 8th place, earned his best start of 2nd, and led his first career lap.

Bodine did not run the Trucks again until 2004, when he competed for Fiddleback Racing at Charlotte, finishing 20th and also ran for HT Motorsports's No. 59 Dodge at Kansas with a 15th. Later, he signed with the new Germain-Arnold Racing team, finishing 4th in their debut at Richmond. After losing in Vegas to Shane Hmiel, Bodine won his first two career races back-to-back at Fontana and Texas. Competing in ten events, Bodine averaged a 13th-place finish in his events, despite falling out of three with mechanical issues. Unfortunately, neither Bodine nor crew chief Mike Hillman Jr. was happy with contract issues and the team leadership. So Bodine parted ways with the team and went back to Fiddleback Racing, where he would drive in 2005. Bodine was able to earn four top-10s with the team in ten starts, but inconsistency was weighing him down to 8th place in points. Fiddleback also had no funding and after a 9th place at Michigan the team was disbanded.

Germain-Arnold signed to have him come back. He won in his second race with the team at Kansas and rolled to four more victories, including three straight at the end of the season. By winning the final three races of the season, he made a serious run for the title. With four races remaining in the season Todd was fourth in the standings, 256 points behind leader Ted Musgrave. With Bodine's three wins, he was able to gain one spot to third and an entire 183 points on Musgrave to finish only 73 points behind.

In 2006, Bodine was once again behind the wheel of the No. 30 Lumber Liquidators Toyota. Bodine won at Atlanta, Gateway, and Texas. Bodine won the 2006 Craftsman Truck Series championship on November 17, 2006, by 122 points over Johnny Benson, with 3 wins, 12 top fives, 16 top tens, a pole at Atlanta, an average finish of 8.4, and zero DNFs; it was Bodine's and Toyota's first-ever championship in any division. Starting in 2009 Lumber Liquidators left the No. 30 truck, while Copart came along to become the sponsor for the season, while still driving for Germain Racing.

In 2010, Bodine stayed consistent all season long to capture the championship title. Driving for Germain Racing, Bodine won 4 races, and picked up 17 top-fives and 20 top-tens, along with 2 poles at Nashville and Chicagoland, and an average finish of 6.4. The consistency had caused him to clinch the championship with one race to go in the season.

For 2011, Bodine struggled with consistency, as he suffered bad luck in most of the first 10 races. In spite of the team's success, sponsorship had been a constant issue for the No. 30 team since as far back as 2005; in 2011, they managed to run 10 races with limited sponsorship. However, after Kentucky, Germain was unable to send the 30 team to Iowa without a sponsor. The week before the race at Iowa, Germain partnered with Randy Moss Motorsports to put Bodine in their 5 truck for the rest of 2011. Although his results improved in the #5 team, Bodine went winless in 2011 (his best finish being a third at Bristol) and subsequently left Germain when the team decided to put its focus on the Sprint Cup Series.

In 2012, Bodine was picked up by Red Horse Racing to run a full schedule. Bodine would run subsequent races with ToyotaCare sponsorship, and won the sixth race of the season, at Dover International Speedway, in a rain-shortened event.

Bodine started the 2013 season driving for ThorSport Racing at Daytona International Speedway, finishing 11th. He followed it up with another 11th in the following race at Martinsville Speedway and ran the next six races for ThorSport before departing from the team following the race at Texas Motor Speedway. Four weeks later, he made what would be his last start for nine years in the Camping World Truck Series at Pocono, driving the #30 truck for Turner Scott Motorsports. He finished 11th.

Bodine ran a total of eight Nationwide Series races from 2014 to 2017 for SS-Green Light Racing and DGM Racing, his best finish being a 19th at Watkins Glen International in 2015. He ran his final race at Charlotte Motor Speedway in 2017 and finished 30th. After five seasons away from the track, 2022 saw an offer from Camping World CEO Marcus Lemonis to sponsor Bodine for 6 races in the truck series to get Bodine to 800 overall starts in NASCAR. Bodine has been confirmed to make a return to the Camping World Truck Series, for 6 races. He will drive for Halmar Friesen Racing in the No. 62 Toyota Tundra. Bodine's first attempt will be a Las Vegas. Bodine has said that this will serve as his farewell tour, known as "The Onion's Last Ride". In July, Bodine achieved his 800th career start across NASCAR's top 3 series when he raced in the CRC Brakleen 150 at Pocono Raceway.

Broadcasting career
Bodine currently works on Fox Sports 1 as a color analyst for select Camping World Truck Series races when Michael Waltrip is unavailable.

Motorsports career results

NASCAR
(key) (Bold – Pole position awarded by qualifying time. Italics – Pole position earned by points standings or practice time. * – Most laps led.)

Sprint Cup Series

Daytona 500

Xfinity Series

Camping World Truck Series

 Season still in progress
 Ineligible for series points

ARCA Re/Max Series
(key) (Bold – Pole position awarded by qualifying time. Italics – Pole position earned by points standings or practice time. * – Most laps led.)

References

External links
 
 

Living people
1964 births
People from Chemung, New York
Racing drivers from New York (state)
NASCAR drivers
NASCAR Truck Series champions
ARCA Menards Series drivers
Bodine family
Herzog Motorsports drivers
Hendrick Motorsports drivers
RFK Racing drivers